Clay Mathematics Monographs is a series of expositions in mathematics co-published by AMS and Clay Mathematics Institute. Each volume in the series offers an exposition of an active area of current research, provided by a group of mathematicians.

List of books

External links
 Clay Mathematics Monographs list at ams.org

Series of mathematics books